Marc Lalonde  (born July 26, 1929) is a retired Canadian politician and cabinet minister.

Life and career
Lalonde was born in Île Perrot, Quebec, and obtained a Master of Laws degree from the Université de Montréal, a master's degree from Oxford University, and a Diplôme d'études supérieures en droit (D.E.S.D) from the University of Ottawa.

In 1959, he worked in Ottawa as a special advisor to Progressive Conservative Justice Minister Davie Fulton. He went to Montreal to practice law until 1967 when he returned to Ottawa to work as an advisor in the Prime Minister's Office under Liberal Prime Minister Lester B. Pearson. Lalonde remained when Pierre Trudeau became Prime Minister of Canada in 1968, serving as Principal Secretary.

At Trudeau's urging, he ran for a seat in the House of Commons of Canada in the 1972 election. Elected as the Liberal Member of Parliament (MP) for the riding of Outremont, Lalonde immediately joined the Cabinet as Minister of National Health and Welfare, a position he held until 1977. He was concurrently Minister of Amateur Sport until 1976 and was also Minister responsible for the Status of Women from 1974 to 1979.

A staunch federalist, he was also one of Trudeau's chief advisors on the situation in Quebec, taking the position of Minister of State on federal-provincial relations in the wake of the Parti Québécois victory in the 1976 Quebec provincial election.

Lalonde served as Minister of Justice from 1978 until the Liberal government's defeat in the 1979 election. When the Liberals returned to power in the 1980 election, Lalonde became Minister of Energy, Mines and Resources and instituted the National Energy Program which became intensely unpopular in Alberta.  From 1982 until 1984, he served as Minister of Finance, instituting a limited program of informal wage and price controls in an effort to reduce inflation.

Lalonde endorsed John Turner in the 1984 Liberal leadership convention and continued as Finance Minister after Turner succeeded Trudeau as Prime Minister in 1984, but did not run in the 1984 election.

In 1989, he was made an Officer of the Order of Canada. In 2004, he was inducted into the Canadian Medical Hall of Fame.

In the 1990s, he served as an ad hoc judge at the International Court of Justice, and has also represented Canada in various trade disputes. He was a practising lawyer with the firm of Stikeman Elliott LLP in Montreal until his retirement in 2006.

He returned to the political arena in 2005 when Prime Minister Paul Martin named him co-president of the Liberal Party's electoral campaign in Quebec for the 39th Canadian federal election. Brigitte Legault, the president of the Young Liberals of Canada (Quebec), served as the other co-president.

Lalonde appeared before the House of Commons of Canada's Ethics Committee in November 2008 along with client Karlheinz Schreiber, who was being questioned in regard to the Airbus affair involving former PM Brian Mulroney.

Archives 
There is a Marc Lalonde fonds at Library and Archives Canada.

See also
A new perspective on the health of Canadians, best known as the "Lalonde report"
Canadian Football Act

References

External links 
 
Order of Canada Citation

1929 births
Living people
French Quebecers
Lawyers in Quebec
Canadian King's Counsel
Canadian Ministers of Finance
Liberal Party of Canada MPs
Members of the House of Commons of Canada from Quebec
Officers of the Order of Canada
Members of the King's Privy Council for Canada
Quebec lieutenants
Université de Montréal alumni
University of Ottawa alumni
Alumni of the University of Oxford
Canadian Ministers of Health and Welfare
Members of the 20th Canadian Ministry
Members of the 22nd Canadian Ministry
Members of the 23rd Canadian Ministry